Helga Krause (1 September 1935 in Dresden – 17 January 1989 in Teltow) was a German film editor.

Life and work
Helga Krause worked from 1953 to 1987 as an editor for the film company DEFA in the former German Democratic Republic. First, she worked from 1953 to 1956 in numerous pioneering monthly newsreels, which were shown in cinemas before the main feature. In 1962, she edited her first DEFA feature film, Freispruch mangels Beweises. In total, she was responsible for the editing of almost 40 feature films in her career including some television films on the German television network (DFF).

The most important works in which Krause was involved include the literary film adaptation of Der teilte Himmel (1964, director: Konrad Wolf), as well as the films forbidden by the state censorship  Das Kaninchen bin ich (1965, Director: Kurt Maetzig) and Denk bloß nicht, ich heule (1965, Director: Frank Vogel). In addition to Vogel, with whom she made four feature films, Helga Krause also worked several times with Siegfried Kühn (five films), Richard Groschopp (three films) and Iris Gusner (three films). Also Gusner's debut film, Die Taube auf dem Dach, was banned and destroyed except for one working copy. The reconstructed film only had its world premiere in 1990, a year after Helga Krause died.

Filmography

Films 
Films edited by Krause include:

 1962: Freispruch mangels Beweises – director: Richard Groschopp
 1963: Die Glatzkopfbande – director: Richard Groschopp
 1963: Julia lebt – director: 
 1964: Der geteilte Himmel – director: Konrad Wolf
 1965 / 1990: Das Kaninchen bin ich – director: Kurt Maetzig
 1965 / 1990: Denk bloß nicht, ich heule – director: Frank Vogel
 1967:  (30-min. Experimentalfilm)  – director: Werner Bergmann
 1967: Chingachgook, die große Schlange – director: Richard Groschopp
 1968: Spur des Falken – director: Gottfried Kolditz
 1969: Das siebente Jahr – director: Frank Vogel
 1970: Im Spannungsfeld – director: Siegfried Kühn
 1971: Zeit der Störche – director: Siegfried Kühn
 1972:  – director: Rainer Simon
 1973 / 1990: Die Taube auf dem Dach – director: Iris Gusner
 1974: Wahlverwandtschaften – director: Siegfried Kühn
 1976:  – director: Iris Gusner
 1977:  – director: Siegfried Kühn
 1978:  – director: Iris Gusner
 1979:  – director: Rainer Simon
 1979:  – director: Ulrich Weiß
 1980: Don Juan, Karl-Liebknecht-Str. 78 – director: Siegfried Kühn
 1983:  – director: Karl-Heinz Heymann
 1984:  – director: Hannelore Unterberg
 1985:  – director: Gunther Scholz
 1986:  – director: Hannelore Unterberg
 1987:  – director: Erwin Stranka
 1987:  – director: Hans Kratzert

Television films
 1962:  (Motion pictures) – director: Hans-Joachim Kasprzik
 1966: Hilmar Thate singt Dessau, Eisler, Hosalla (Documentary) – director: Ingrid Sander
 1969:  (five-part feature film, part 5: "Die Zeit der Fundamente") – together with Renate Müller / director: Horst E. Brandt
 1970: Der Mörder sitzt im Wembley-Stadion (Two-part feature film) – director: Gerhard Respondek
 1972: Ein Mann, der sterben muß (Motion pictures) – director: Peter Hagen
 1972: Der Mann und das Mädchen (Motion pictures) – director: 
 1977: Auftrag für M & S (Motion pictures) – director: Peter Deutsch
 1978: Amor holt sich nasse Füße (Motion pictures) – director: Hans Knötzsch
 1981:  (TV series) – director: Peter Vogel
 1981:  (Children's film) – director: Brigitte Natusch
 1983: Alfons Köhler (Motion pictures) – director: Peter Vogel

References

External links

 
 

German film editors
1935 births
1989 deaths
People from Dresden
German women film editors